Carpenito is a surname. Notable people with the surname include:
 Craig Carpenito (born 1973), American lawyer
 Frank Carpenito, American businessman